Sunset Mission is the third full-length record from Bohren & der Club of Gore. It is their first album to feature sax player Christoph Clöser, more explicitly exploring jazz than earlier recordings.

The liner notes include a quote from Matt Wagner's Grendel comic book, which reads: "Alone in the comforting darkness the creature waits. As confusion reigns on this hellish stage, the deafening grind of machinery, the odious clot of chemical waste. Still, the trail of his ultimate prey leads through this steely maze to these, the addled offspring of the modern world."

Track listing
 "Prowler" – 5:03
 "On Demon Wings" – 7:01
 "Midnight Walker" – 7:17
 "Street Tattoo" – 9:51
 "Painless Steel" – 5:47
 "Darkstalker" – 5:43
 "Nightwolf" – 16:31
 "Black City Skyline" – 5:50
 "Dead End Angels" – 10:25

Personnel
Morten Gass – piano
Christoph Clöser – tenor saxophone
Thorsten Benning – drums
Robin Rodenberg – bass

References

2000 albums
Bohren & der Club of Gore albums